Mesua purseglovei is a species of flowering plant in the family Calophyllaceae. It is a tree endemic to Peninsular Malaysia. It is threatened by habitat loss.

References

purseglovei
Endemic flora of Peninsular Malaysia
Trees of Peninsular Malaysia
Vulnerable plants
Taxonomy articles created by Polbot